The Principality of Salm was a short-lived client state of Napoleonic France located in Westphalia.

History
Salm was created in 1802 as a state of the Holy Roman Empire in order to compensate the princes of Salm-Kyrburg and Salm-Salm, who had lost their states to France in 1793–1795. The territory of the new principality was formally assigned by the Reichsdeputationshauptschluss of 1803. The new territory was not near most of the old territories of the princes, but instead extended the County of Anholt, which had been a minor possession of the prince of Salm-Salm. Most of the area was taken from the dissolved Bishopric of Münster.

The Principality of Salm was ruled jointly by the princes of Salm-Kyrburg and Salm-Salm, Frederick IV, Prince of Salm-Kyrburg, and Constantine, Prince of Salm-Salm; each line had equal sovereign rights, but neither had a separate territory. Salm became independent and joined the Confederation of the Rhine in 1806. It was annexed by France in 1811. Its territory was given to Prussia by the Congress of Vienna in 1815; it became the westernmost part of the Prussian Province of Westphalia. In 1871, The German Empire used a flag identical to Salm's tricolour flag.

Geography
The capital of Salm was Bocholt. Salm had an area of about 1,760 km2 and a population of 59,086. It covered approximately the same area as the present-day District of Borken.

External links
Principality of Salm, at flaggenlexikon.de (in German and in English)

Former countries in Europe
Former principalities
Principalities of the Holy Roman Empire
States of the Confederation of the Rhine
1802 establishments in Europe
1811 disestablishments in Europe
States and territories established in 1802
Real unions
Former states and territories of North Rhine-Westphalia